The Middlesbrough by-election was a by-election for the Parliament of the United Kingdom's House of Commons constituency of Middlesbrough.  The by-election was caused by the death of its Member of Parliament, Sir Stuart Bell. It was held on 29 November 2012, the same day as by-elections in Croydon North and Rotherham.

The deadline for nominations was 14 November. The election returned a Labour member of parliament, with UKIP second and the Liberal Democrats third.

Candidates
Labour selected Andy McDonald, a solicitor born in Middlesbrough and former councillor for Westbourne ward from 1995 to 1999, for the seat. At the time, McDonald was chairman of Middlesbrough Labour Party Local Government Committee.

UKIP selected Richard Elvin, chairman of the North East Regional Committee, as their candidate. He contested the Houghton and Sunderland South seat for UKIP in 2009.

The Liberal Democrats selected George Selmer, who works in employment services, as their candidate.

Stockton borough Councillor Ben Houchen was the Conservative candidate. He would later go on to become Tees Valley Mayor.

In November 2012, Councillor Imdad Hussain, who had been suspended from the Labour Party for two years after failing to disclose he had been banned as a company director, resigned from the party and announced he would be standing for the Peace Party in the by-election.

Campaigner Mark Heslehurst launched his candidacy as a self-styled 'independent Labour' candidate. He had no description on the ballot paper. He had previously organised events to raise awareness of an issue related to his estranged partner and son, which involved walking 500 miles to Downing Street.

The BNP candidate was Peter Foreman.

Trade Unionist and Socialist Coalition candidate John Malcolm was the Tees, Esk & Wear Valley Health Unison branch representative.

Current independent Middlesbrough mayor Ray Mallon mooted the possibility of standing in the by-election, depending on the quality of other candidates, but did not submit his candidacy.

Hustings
Hustings were held at St Barnabas' Church on 26 November 2012, hosted by Friends of the Earth. The lively proceedings went well, with members of the audience asking over 20 questions on topics ranging from education and services to employment and the environment. Six of the eight candidates were invited.

Result
The Labour Party held the seat, with McDonald elected as the new MP.  Along with other by-elections held on the same day, there were sharp declines in the vote for the governing coalition parties, although this was the only one of the three at which they both retained their deposit, and the only one at which the Liberal Democrats finished ahead of the Conservatives.  UKIP finished in second place.  Previously they had only come second in one other parliamentary election (the Barnsley Central by-election in 2011).  They also came second in the Rotherham contest held on the same date as the Middlesbrough election.

The result was also notable as the first time the Peace Party had ever retained their deposit at a parliamentary election and their highest percentage of vote share in a single constituency.

See also
1878 Middlesbrough by-election
List of United Kingdom by-elections
Opinion polling for the 2015 United Kingdom general election

References

By-elections to the Parliament of the United Kingdom in Middlesbrough constituencies
Middlesbrough by-election
Middlesbrough by-election
Middlesbrough by-election
2010s in North Yorkshire